Since the September 11 attacks of the previous year, foreign policy and international relations have been generally united in combatting al-Qaeda and other terrorist organizations. The United States especially was a leading force in combatting terrorist groups. 2002 also saw the signing and establishment of many international agreements and institutions, most notably the International Criminal Court, the African Union, the Russian-American Strategic Offensive Reductions Treaty, and the Eurozone.

The global economy, partly due to the September 11 attacks, generally stagnated or declined. Stock indices, such as the American Dow Jones Industrial Average and the Japanese Nikkei 225 both ended the year lower than they had started. In the later parts of 2002, the world saw the beginning of a SARS epidemic, which would go on to affect mostly China, Europe, and North America.

Prominent deaths in 2002 included world leaders Hugo Banzer, John Gorton, Fernando Belaúnde and Ne Win. The British royal family in particular saw two major funerals, that of Queen Elizabeth The Queen Mother and Princess Margaret. The year witnessed the passing of film figures Chuck Jones, Billy Wilder, María Félix and Rod Steiger; and musicians Layne Staley, John Entwistle and Joe Strummer. 2002 also marked the births of actors Jenna Ortega and Finn Wolfhard, as well as athletes Pedri and Emma Raducanu.

Events

January
 January – Operation Enduring Freedom – Philippines: The Philippines and the United States begin a joint operation to combat Jihadist groups in the Philippines.
 January 1
 The Open Skies mutual surveillance treaty, initially signed in 1992, officially enters into force.
 The Euro is officially introduced in the Eurozone countries. The former currencies of all the countries that use the Euro ceased to be legal tender on February 28.
 January 6 – The Boston Globe publishes results of an investigation leading to the criminal prosecutions of five Roman Catholic priests and bringing widespread attention to the sexual abuse of minors by Catholic clergy.
 January 17 – Mount Nyiragongo erupts in the Democratic Republic of the Congo, displacing an estimated 400,000 people.
 January 18 – The Sierra Leone Civil War comes to a conclusion with the defeat of the Revolutionary United Front by government forces.
 January 27 – 2002 Lagos armoury explosion: Explosives are set off accidentally in Lagos, Nigeria, causing widespread fires and a human stampede. Over one thousand people are killed, and thousands are left homeless.

February
 February 3 – 2002 Afyon earthquake: A 6.0 magnitude earthquake strikes Afyonkarahisar Province, Turkey, killing 41 people and damaging thousands of buildings.
 February 6 – Queen Elizabeth II of the Commonwealth realms celebrates her Golden Jubilee, marking 50 years since her accession to the thrones of the United Kingdom, Canada, Australia and New Zealand.
 February 8–24 – The 2002 Winter Olympics are held in Salt Lake City, Utah.
 February 12 – The trial of Slobodan Milošević, the former president of Yugoslavia, begins at the International Criminal Tribunal for the former Yugoslavia in The Hague.
 February 14 – The State of Bahrain is declared a constitutional monarchy and becomes the Kingdom of Bahrain.
 February 19 – NASA's 2001 Mars Odyssey space probe begins to map the surface of Mars using its thermal emission imaging system.
 February 20 – 2002 El Ayyat railway accident: A train fire in El Ayyat, Egypt kills at least 370 people.
 February 22
 UNITA guerrilla leader Jonas Savimbi is killed in clashes against government troops led by Angolan President José Eduardo dos Santos in Moxico Province, Angola.
 The government of Sri Lanka and the Tamil Tigers agree to a ceasefire, temporarily ending the Sri Lankan Civil War. It would last until the resumption of hostilities in 2008.
 February 27 – A mob attacks a train near Godhra, India, killing approximately 59 people. The state of Gujarat breaks out into riots, including the Gulbarg Society massacre on February 28 that kills approximately 69 people.

March
 March – 2002–2003 conflict in the Pool Department: The Ninja militia attacks government forces in the Republic of the Congo, triggering a long-term conflict.
 March 1 – The Envisat environmental satellite is launched, with its purpose being the recording of information on environmental change.
 March 2 – Switzerland votes in favor of a referendum to join the United Nations, challenging a long-held tradition of neutrality and isolationism.
 March 2–10 – Afghan and coalition troops carry out Operation Anaconda in the Shah-i-Kot Valley, the largest combat operation against Al-Qaeda and the Taliban to that point.
 March 11 – A fire at a girls' school in Mecca, Saudi Arabia kills 15 students. The deaths are attributed to Islamic religious police that prevented the girls from leaving because their dress did not comply with Islamic standards of modesty.
 March 25 – 2002 Hindu Kush earthquakes: A 6.1 magnitude earthquake strikes Nahrin, Afghanistan, killing 800 people and leaving 10,000 homeless.
 March 27 – A Palestinian suicide bomber kills 30 people and injures 140 others at a hotel in Netanya, Israel.
 March 29 – In response to increasing terrorist attacks by Palestinians, Israeli initiates Operation Defensive Shield, a large-scale counter-terrorism operation in the West Bank.

April
 April 1
 The South West State of Somalia is established as an autonomous territory in Somalia by Hasan Muhammad Nur Shatigadud.
 Battle of Jenin: Israeli forces attack a refugee camp from which Palestinian terrorist attacks were carried out.
 April 2 – Siege of the Church of the Nativity in Bethlehem: Israeli forces besiege the Church of the Nativity in Bethlehem when militants take shelter there. The siege will last for 38 days.
 April 3–8 – Battle of Nablus: Israeli forces occupy Nablus, Palestine.
 April 4 – A peace agreement is made to end the Angolan Civil War.
 April 11
The military high command refuse President Hugo Chávez's order to implement the Plan Ávila as a response to the protests and demands his resignation. President Chávez is subsequently arrested by the military. Chávez's request for asylum in Cuba is denied, and he is ordered to be tried in a Venezuelan court.
 Ghriba synagogue bombing: 21 people are killed in a synagogue bombing in Djerba, Tunisia.
 April 14 – President Hugo Chávez of Venezuela is restored to power following an attempted coup.
 April 15 – Air China Flight 129 crashes into a hillside during heavy rain and fog near Busan, South Korea, killing 129 people.
 April 25 – South African Mark Shuttleworth blasts off from the Baikonur Cosmodrome on the Soyuz TM-34, becoming the first African space tourist.

May
May 2 – Bojayá massacre: A church is struck with a cylinder bomb during a conflict between the Revolutionary Armed Forces of Colombia and the United Self-Defense Forces of Colombia, killing an estimated 119 people.
May 9 – 2002 Kaspiysk bombing: Over 40 people are killed when insurgents bomb a military parade in Kaspiysk, Russia.
May 12 – Buran, the Russian equivalent to the Space Shuttle, is destroyed in a storm at Baikonur.
May 14 – Militants attack a bus and an Indian army camp in Kaluchak, Jammu and Kashmir, killing at least 33 people.
May 20 – East Timor regains its independence after  years of United Nations administration and 26 years of occupation by Indonesia since 1975.
 May 24 – In Moscow, United States President George W. Bush and Russian President Vladimir Putin sign the Strategic Offensive Reductions Treaty to replace the Anti-Ballistic Missile Treaty of 1972 and the START II Treaty of 1993.
 May 25 – China Airlines Flight 611 breaks up and crashes in the Taiwan Strait, killing all 225 passengers and crew on board.
 May 31–June 30 – The 2002 FIFA World Cup takes place in South Korea and Japan; which is ultimately won by Brazil.

June
 June 4
 2002 FIFA World Cup: The South Koreans achieve their first ever FIFA World Cup match victory (not the whole tournament). South Korea had never won a World Cup match before.
 The dwarf planet 50000 Quaoar is discovered.
 The Zeyzoun Dam in Zayzun, Syria fails.
 June 6 – An object with an estimated diameter of 10 meters enters the Earth's atmosphere over the Mediterranean and detonates in mid-air.
 June 10 
 Solar eclipse of June 10, 2002: A large annular solar eclipse covers over 99% of the Sun, creating a dramatic spectacle for observers in a narrow path at most 13 km wide; it lasts just 23 seconds at the point of maximum eclipse. It is seen from Australasia, across the Pacific and the Mexico coast, and is the 35th solar eclipse of Solar Saros 137.
 British scientist Kevin Warwick carries out first direct electronic communication experiment between the nervous systems of two humans.
 June 13 – Afghanistan changes its official longform name to the Transitional Islamic State of Afghanistan.
 June 22 – 2002 Bou'in-Zahra earthquake: A 6.3 magnitude earthquake strikes north-western Iran, killing approximately 440 people.
 June 24 – A passenger train collides with a freight train in Dodoma Region, Tanzania, killing 281 people, making it the worst rail accident in African history.
 June 29 – Second Battle of Yeonpyeong: During the 2002 FIFA World Cup in South Korea and Japan, two North Korean patrol boats cross a contested border in between the two Koreas and attack two South Korean Chamsuri-class patrol boats.
 June 30 – 2002 FIFA World Cup: Brazil beats Germany 2–0 in the 2002 FIFA World Cup Final with Ronaldo scoring the two goals; Brazil's captain Cafu, who becomes the first player to appear in three successive World Cup finals, accepts the trophy on behalf of the team.

July
 July 1
 The Rome Statute comes into force, thereby establishing the International Criminal Court.
 A Bashkirian Airlines Tupolev Tu-154 passenger jet and a DHL Boeing 757-200F cargo plane collide over the town of Überlingen, Germany, killing 71 people.
 July 9 – The Organisation of African Unity is disbanded and replaced by the African Union.
 July 11
 The first synthetic virus is announced after being successfully created and tested at Stony Brook University.
 Perejil Island crisis: Moroccan occupy the uninhabited Spanish-controlled Perejil Island, leading to a week-long standoff before Spanish forces reclaim the island.
 July 13 – Militants attack in Qasim Nagar, Jammu and Kashmir, killing 29 people.
 July 14 – The only captive baiji dolphin dies as the species approaches extinction.
 July 27 – Sknyliv air show disaster: 77 people are killed and 543 injured when a Ukrainian Air Force Su-27 fighter jet crashes into spectators during an aerobatics presentation at Sknyliv airfield near Lviv, Ukraine. It is the deadliest air show accident in history.

August
 August 19 – 2002 Khankala Mi-26 crash: Chechen separatists shoot down a Russian Mil Mi-26, killing 127 soldiers. It was the worst aviation disaster in the history of the Russian military.
 August 26 – Earth Summit 2002 begins in Johannesburg, South Africa, aimed at discussing sustainable development by the United Nations.
 August 22–September 4 – Typhoon Rusa, the most powerful typhoon to hit South Korea in 43 years, made landfall, killing at least 236 people.

September
 September 10 – Switzerland joins the United Nations as the 190th member state after rejecting a place in 1986.
 September 19 – General Robert Guéï leads an army mutiny in an attempt to overthrow Ivory Coast President Laurent Gbagbo, resulting in civil war.
 September 20 – The Kolka–Karmadon rock ice slide in Northern Ossetia, Russia kills at least 125 people.
 September 24 – Akshardham Temple attack: Gunmen attack a temple in Gandhinagar, India, killing 30 people.
 September 25 – The Vitim event, a possible bolide impact, occurs in Irkutsk Oblast, Russia.
 September 26 – The Senegalese passenger ferry MV Le Joola capsizes in a storm off the coast of the Gambia, killing 1,863 people.
 September 27 – East Timor is admitted to the United Nations as the 191st member state; it also changes its official longform name from "Democratic Republic of East Timor" to "Democratic Republic of Timor-Leste".

October
 October – Operation Enduring Freedom – Horn of Africa: The United States deploys troops to the Horn of Africa to combat Islamist groups and pirates.
 October 11 – The United States Congress approves military action in Iraq should it fail to comply with United Nations requirements for weapon of mass destruction.
 October 12 – Jemaah Islamiyah militants detonate multiple bombs in two nightclubs in Kuta, Indonesia, killing 202 people and injuring over 300 in the worst terrorist act in Indonesia's history.
 October 23–25 – Chechen rebels take control of the Nord-Ost theatre in Moscow and hold the audience hostage. At least 170 people are killed following a Russian attempt to subdue the militants.
 October 24 – 2002 Bahraini general election: Bahrain holds its first Parliamentary elections since 1973.
 October 29 – Ho Chi Minh City ITC fire: A fire at the International Trade Centre in Ho Chi Minh City, Vietnam kills at least 54 people.

November
 November 7 – A sovereignty referendum is held in Gibraltar. The people reject Spanish sovereignty.
 November 8 – The United Nations Security Council unanimously adopts Resolution 1441, forcing Iraq to either disarm or face "serious consequences". Iraq agrees to the terms of the resolution on November 13.
 November 13 – Prestige oil spill: Greek oil tanker  begins spilling oil coast of Galicia. It will continue until November 19, spilling 60,000 tonnes of oil in the worst environmental disaster in the history of the Iberian Peninsula.
 November 16 – 2002–2004 SARS outbreak: The first case of the Severe acute respiratory syndrome (SARS) epidemic, a zoonosis caused by a coronavirus, is recorded in Guangdong province of south China.
 November 20 – Miss World riots: Muslims in Nigeria riot against the Miss World pageant, killing hundreds.
 November 25 – U.S. President George W. Bush signs the Homeland Security Act into law, establishing the Department of Homeland Security, in the largest U.S. government reorganization since the creation of the Department of Defense in 1947. Following a several month-long transitional period, it commences operations the following year.
 November 28 – 2002 Mombasa attacks: Suicide bombers blow up an Israeli-owned hotel in Mombasa, Kenya, but their colleagues fail in their attempt to bring down an Arkia Israel Airlines charter flight with surface-to-air-missiles.

December
December 23 – A U.S. MQ-1 Predator is shot down by an Iraqi MiG-25 in the first combat engagement between a drone and conventional aircraft.
December 27
2002 Grozny truck bombing: Chechen suicide bombers attack the government headquarters in Grozny, Russia, killing over 70 people.
2002 Kenyan general election: Kenya holds its first free elections, ousting the dominant Kenya African National Union Party following a victory of the National Rainbow Coalition.

Births

 January 17 – Samuel, American-South Korean singer
 January 18 – Karim Adeyemi, German footballer
 January 22 – Joško Gvardiol, Croatian footballer
 February 1 – Marta Fiedina, Ukrainian synchro swimmer
 February 5
 Davis Cleveland, American actor 
 Shirin van Anrooij, Dutch professional racing cyclist
 February 9 – Jalen Green, American basketball player
 February 13 – Sophia Lillis, American actress
 February 17 – Kelly Sildaru, Estonian freestyle skier
 February 23 – Emilia Jones, English actress
 April 8 – Skai Jackson, American actress
 April 16 – Sadie Sink, American actress
 April 19 – Loren Gray, American singer-songwriter and social media personality
 May 1 – Chet Holmgren, American basketball player
 May 9 – Jerome Foster II, American climate change activist and political advisor
 May 15 – Hala Al Turk, Bahraini singer
 May 18 – Alina Zagitova, Russian figure skater
 May 21 – Elena Huelva, Spanish cancer activist and influencer (d. 2023)
 June 8 – Athing Mu, American track runner
 June 10 - Belle Mariano, Filipino actress and singer
 June 29 – Marlhy Murphy, American musician and media personality
 July 12 – Nico Williams, Spanish footballer
 July 13 - Afshin Esmaeil Ghaderzadeh, shortest living person in the World
 July 21 – Rika Kihira, Japanese figure skater
 July 22 – Prince Felix of Denmark
 July 25 – Adam Hložek, Czech footballer
 August 25 – Destiny, Maltese singer
 September 6
 Asher Angel, American actor
 Leylah Fernandez, Canadian tennis player
 September 8 – Gaten Matarazzo, American actor
 September 17 – Zinaida Kupriyanovich, Belarusian singer and presenter
 September 27 – Jenna Ortega, American actress
 September 30
 Levi Miller, Australian actor
 Maddie Ziegler, American dancer and actress
 October 1 - Olivia Dunne Gymnast and Tik-Toker 
 October 4 – Ty Gibbs, American professional stock car racing driver
 October 20 – Yeremy Pino, Spanish footballer
 October 24 – Ado, Japanese singer
 October 26 – Julian Dennison, New Zealand actor
 October 29 – Ruel, Australian singer-songwriter
 October 31 – Ansu Fati, Bissau-Guinean born-Spanish footballer
 November 1 – NLE Choppa, American rapper
 November 12 – Thibau Nys, Belgian cyclo-cross and road cyclist
 November 13 
Emma Raducanu, British tennis player
Giovanni Reyna, American soccer player
 November 25 – Pedri, Spanish footballer
 November 29 – Yunus Musah, American soccer player
 December 17 – Stefania, Dutch born-Greek singer and voice actress
 December 23 – Finn Wolfhard, Canadian actor

Deaths

January

 January 6 – Sanya Dharmasakti, 12th Prime Minister of Thailand (b. 1907)
 January 8
Alexander Prokhorov, Russian Nobel physicist (b. 1916)
Dave Thomas, American businessman, founder and CEO of Wendy's (b. 1932)
 January 10 – John Buscema, American comic book artist (b. 1927)
 January 11 – Henri Verneuil, French filmmaker and playwright (b. 1920)
 January 12 – Cyrus Vance, American politician (b. 1917)
 January 13 – Ted Demme, American director and producer (b. 1963)
 January 17 – Camilo José Cela, Spanish writer (b. 1916)
 January 19
 Martti Miettunen, 27th Prime Minister of Finland (b. 1907)
 Vavá, Brazilian footballer (b. 1934)
 January 20 – R. N. Kao, Indian spymaster (b. 1918)
 January 21 – Peggy Lee, American singer and actress (b. 1920)
 January 23
 Pierre Bourdieu, French sociologist (b. 1930)
 Robert Nozick, American philosopher (b. 1938)
 January 28 – Astrid Lindgren, Swedish children's book author (b. 1907)
 January 30 – Inge Morath, Austrian-born American photographer (b. 1923)
 January 31 – Gabby Gabreski, Polish-American fighter ace (b. 1919)

February

 February 1
 Hildegard Knef, German actress (b. 1925)
 Daniel Pearl, American journalist (b. 1963)
 February 4
 Agatha Barbara, 3rd President of Malta (b. 1923)
 Sigvard Bernadotte, Count of Wisborg (b. 1907)
 George Nader, American actor (b. 1921)
 February 6 – Max Perutz, Austrian-born British Nobel molecular biologist (b. 1914)
 February 7 – Zizinho, Brazilian football player (b. 1921)
 February 8
 Ong Teng Cheong, 5th President of Singapore (b. 1936)
 Esther Afua Ocloo, Ghanaian entrepreneur and pioneer of microlending (b. 1919)
 February 9 – Princess Margaret, Countess of Snowdon (b. 1930)
 February 10
 Ramón Arellano Félix, Mexican drug trafficker (b. 1964)
 Traudl Junge, German private secretary of Adolf Hitler (b. 1920)
 February 13 – Waylon Jennings, American country music singer (b. 1937)
 February 14 – Nándor Hidegkuti, Hungarian footballer (b. 1922)
 February 19 – Sylvia Rivera, American transgender activist (b. 1951) 
 February 21 – John Thaw, English actor (b. 1942) 
 February 22
 Chuck Jones, American animator (b. 1912)
 Jonas Savimbi, Angolan rebel and political leader (b. 1934)
 February 26 – Lawrence Tierney, American actor (b. 1919)
 February 27 – Spike Milligan, British-Irish comedian (b. 1918)

March

 March 10 – Irene Worth, American actress (b. 1916)
 March 11 – James Tobin, American Nobel economist (b. 1918)
 March 12 – Spyros Kyprianou, 2nd President of Cyprus (b. 1932)
 March 13 –
 Hans-Georg Gadamer, German philosopher (b. 1900)
 Nasir Hussain, Indian film director (b. 1926)
 March 20 – Ibn al-Khattab, Saudi guerrilla (b. 1969)
 March 24 – César Milstein, Argentine Nobel biochemist (b. 1927)
 March 27
 Milton Berle, American comedian (b. 1908)
 Dudley Moore, English pianist, comedian, and actor (b. 1935)
 Billy Wilder, Polish-American film screenwriter and director (b. 1906)
 March 30 – Queen Elizabeth The Queen Mother, Queen Consort of the United Kingdom 1936-1952 (b. 1900)

April

 April 1 – Simo Häyhä, Finnish sniper (b. 1905)
 April 2 – Jack Kruschen, Canadian actor (b. 1922)
 April 5 – Layne Staley, American singer (b. 1967)
 April 8 – María Félix, Mexican actress (b. 1914)
April 9 - Leopold Vietoris, Austrian mathematician and supercentenarian (b. 1891)
 April 16
 Ramiro de León Carpio, 31st President of Guatemala (b. 1942)
 Robert Urich, Canadian-born American actor (b. 1946)
 April 18 – Thor Heyerdahl, Norwegian explorer (b. 1914)
 April 22 – Linda Lovelace, American pornographic actress (b. 1949)
 April 25 – Lisa Lopes, American rapper (b. 1971)
 April 28 – Lou Thesz, American professional wrestler (b. 1916)

May

 May 3 – Muhammad Haji Ibrahim Egal, 2-Time Prime Minister of Somalia (b. 1928)
 May 5 – Hugo Banzer, Bolivian politician, 51st President of Bolivia (b. 1926)
 May 6 – Pim Fortuyn, Dutch politician, author and professor (b. 1948) (see Assassination of Pim Fortuyn)
 May 11 – Joseph Bonanno, Italian-born gangster (b. 1905)
 May 13 – Valeriy Lobanovskyi, Ukrainian footballer and manager (b. 1939)
 May 17 – László Kubala, Hungarian footballer (b. 1927)
 May 19 – Sir John Gorton, 19th Prime Minister of Australia (b. 1911)
 May 20 – Stephen Jay Gould, American paleontologist and author (b. 1941)
 May 21 – Niki de Saint Phalle, French artist (b. 1930)
 May 23 – Sam Snead, American professional golfer (b. 1912)
 May 26 – Mamo Wolde, Ethiopian runner (b. 1932)

June

 June 1 – Hansie Cronje, South African cricketer (b. 1969)
 June 4 – Fernando Belaúnde, Peruvian politician, 2-Time President of Peru (b. 1912)
 June 5 – Dee Dee Ramone, American bassist (b. 1951)
 June 7 – Lilian, Princess of Réthy, Belgian princess (b. 1916)
 June 10 – John Gotti, American gangster (b. 1940)
 June 15 – Choi Hong Hi, Korean martial artist (b. 1918)
 June 24 – Pierre Werner, Luxembourgian politician, 19th and 21st Prime Minister of Luxembourg (b. 1913)
 June 27 – John Entwistle, English bassist (b. 1944)
 June 29 – Rosemary Clooney, American singer and actress (b. 1928)

July

 July 5 – Katy Jurado, Mexican actress (b. 1924)
 July 6
 Dhirubhai Ambani, Indian businessman (b. 1932)
 John Frankenheimer, American film director (b. 1930)
 July 8 – Ward Kimball, American cartoonist (b. 1914)
 July 9 – Rod Steiger, American actor (b. 1925)
 July 13 – Yousuf Karsh, Turkish-born photographer (b. 1908)
 July 14 – Joaquín Balaguer, Dominican politician, 41st, 45th and 49th President of the Dominican Republic (b. 1906)
 July 17 – Joseph Luns, Dutch politician and diplomat, 5th Secretary General of NATO (b. 1911)
 July 19 – Alan Lomax, American folklorist and musicologist (b. 1915)
 July 23 – Chaim Potok, American author and rabbi (b. 1929)
 July 28 – Archer Martin, English Nobel chemist (b. 1910)

August

 August 3 – Carmen Silvera, English actress (b. 1922)
 August 5 – Josh Ryan Evans, American actor (b. 1982)
 August 6 – Edsger W. Dijkstra, Dutch computer scientist (b. 1930)
 August 10 
 Kristen Nygaard, Norwegian computer scientist (b. 1926)
 Eugene Odum, American biologist (b. 1913)
 August 14 
 Peter R. Hunt, English film director (b. 1925)
 Dave Williams, American musician (b. 1972)
 August 16 
 Jeff Corey, American actor (b. 1914)
 Abu Nidal, Palestinian militant (b. 1937)
 August 19 – Eduardo Chillida, Spanish Basque sculptor (b. 1924)
 August 30
 Zaid ibn Shaker, 3-Time Prime Minister of Jordan (b. 1934)
 J. Lee Thompson, English film director (b. 1914)
 August 31
 Lionel Hampton, American musician (b. 1908)
 George Porter, English Nobel chemist (b. 1920)

September

 September 7 – Erma Franklin, American singer (b. 1938)
 September 11
 Kim Hunter, American actress (b. 1922)
 Johnny Unitas, American football player (b. 1933)
 September 14 – LaWanda Page, American comedian
 September 16 – Nguyễn Văn Thuận, Vietnamese cardinal (b. 1928)
 September 18 – Bob Hayes, American athlete (b. 1942)
 September 19 – Robert Guéï, Ivorian military ruler (b. 1941)
 September 20 – Sergei Bodrov Jr., Soviet and Russian actor (b. 1971; killed in the Kolka–Karmadon rock ice slide)
 September 22 – Mickey Newbury, American singer-songwriter (b. 1940)

October

 October 6 – Prince Claus of the Netherlands, prince consort of the Netherlands (b. 1926)
 October 9 – Aileen Wuornos, American serial killer (b. 1956)
 October 10 – Teresa Graves, American actress and comedian (b. 1948)
 October 11 – Dina Pathak, Indian actress
 October 12 
 Ray Conniff, American musician and bandleader (b. 1916)
 Audrey Mestre, French freediver (b. 1974)
 Nozomi Momoi, Japanese AV idol (b. 1977)
 October 13 – Stephen E. Ambrose, American historian and biographer (b. 1936)
 October 19 – Manuel Álvarez Bravo, Mexican photographer (b. 1902)
 October 22 – Geraldine of Albania, Queen consort of Albania (b. 1915)
 October 23 – Richard Helms, American academic and author (b. 1913)
 October 24 – Harry Hay, American gay rights activist, communist and labor advocate (b. 1912)
 October 25
 Richard Harris, Irish actor (b. 1930)
 René Thom, French mathematician (b. 1923)
 October 30 – Jam Master Jay, American Hip-Hop DJ (b. 1965)
 October 31 – Michail Stasinopoulos, 1st President of Greece (b. 1903)

November

 November 2 – Lo Lieh, Hong Kong actor (b. 1939)
 November 3
 Lonnie Donegan, British skiffle musician (b. 1931)
 Jonathan Harris, American actor (b. 1914)
 November 4 – Antonio Margheriti, Italian filmmaker (b. 1930)
 November 13 – Juan Alberto Schiaffino, Italian-Uruguayan footballer (b. 1925)
 November 14 – Eddie Bracken, American actor (b. 1915)
 November 15 – Sohn Kee-Chung, Korean Olympic athlete (b. 1912)
 November 17 – Abba Eban, Israeli politician and diplomat, 3rd Foreign Minister of Israel (b. 1915)
 November 18 – James Coburn, American actor (b. 1928)
 November 21 – Norihito, Prince Takamado (b. 1954)
 November 23 – Roberto Matta, Chilean artist (b. 1911)
 November 24 – John Rawls, American political theorist (b. 1921)
 November 25 – Karel Reisz, Czech-born British filmmaker (b. 1926)

December

 December 2 –Ivan Illich, Austrian philosopher and Catholic priest (b. 1926)
 December 3 – Glenn Quinn, Irish actor (b. 1970)
 December 5 – Ne Win, Burmese military commander, 4th President of Burma (b. 1910)
 December 12
 Dee Brown, American novelist and historian (b. 1908)
 Brad Dexter, American actor and film producer (b. 1917)
 December 18 – Ray Hnatyshyn, Canadian statesman, 24th Governor General of Canada (b. 1934)
 December 20 – Grote Reber, American astronomer (b. 1911)
 December 22
 Desmond Hoyte, Guyanese politician, 3rd Prime Minister and 4th President of Guyana (b. 1929)
 Joe Strummer, English musician (b. 1952)
 December 24 – Tita Merello, Argentinian actress and singer (b. 1904)
 December 26 – Herb Ritts, American photographer (b. 1952)
 December 27 – George Roy Hill, American film director (b. 1921)
 December 30 – Mary Brian, American actress (b. 1906)

Nobel Prizes

 Chemistry – John B. Fenn and Koichi Tanaka, Kurt Wüthrich
 Economics – Daniel Kahneman and Vernon L. Smith
 Literature – Imre Kertész
 Peace – Jimmy Carter
 Physics – Raymond Davis Jr. and Masatoshi Koshiba, Riccardo Giacconi
 Physiology or Medicine – Sydney Brenner, H. Robert Horvitz, and John E. Sulston

References

External links
 2002 Year-End Google Zeitgeist – Google's Yearly List of Major Events and Top Searches for 2002
 Top Stories of 2002 - CNN
 Year in Review - Netscape